Marguerite Ruygrok (born 3 June 1947) is an Australian former breaststroke swimmer. She competed in two events at the 1964 Summer Olympics.

References

External links
 

1947 births
Living people
Australian female breaststroke swimmers
Olympic swimmers of Australia
Swimmers at the 1964 Summer Olympics
Place of birth missing (living people)
Commonwealth Games medallists in swimming
Commonwealth Games gold medallists for Australia
Swimmers at the 1962 British Empire and Commonwealth Games
20th-century Australian women
21st-century Australian women
Medallists at the 1962 British Empire and Commonwealth Games